Jesús Silva Herzog (14 November 1892 – 13 March 1985) was a Mexican economist and historian specialized in the Mexican Revolution and a member of The National College. He received the National Prize for Arts and Sciences in 1962. His son, former Mexican Secretary of Finance Jesús Silva Herzog Flores, and grandson, Jesús Silva Herzog Márquez, are also prominent men in Mexico's political and intellectual life.

References

1892 births
1985 deaths
20th-century Mexican historians
Mexican economists
Members of El Colegio Nacional (Mexico)
Members of the Inter-American Dialogue
Academic staff of the National Autonomous University of Mexico
People from San Luis Potosí City
Recipients of the Belisario Domínguez Medal of Honor